Bent's Old Fort is an 1833 fort located in Otero County in southeastern Colorado, United States. A company owned by Charles Bent and William Bent and Ceran St. Vrain built the fort to trade with Southern Cheyenne and Arapaho Plains Indians and trappers for buffalo robes. For much of its 16-year history, the fort was the only major white American permanent settlement on the Santa Fe Trail between Missouri and the Mexican settlements. It was destroyed in 1849.

The area of the fort was designated a National Historic Site under the National Park Service on June 3, 1960. It was further designated a National Historic Landmark later that year on December 19, 1960.
The fort was reconstructed and is open to the public.

History
The adobe fort quickly became the center of the Bent, St. Vrain Company's expanding trade empire, which included Fort Saint Vrain to the north and Fort Adobe to the south, along with company stores in New Mexico at Taos and Santa Fe. The primary trade was with the Southern Cheyenne and Arapaho Indians for buffalo robes.

From 1833 to 1849, the fort was a stopping point along the Santa Fe Trail. It was the only permanent settlement not under the jurisdiction and control of Native Americans or Mexicans. The U.S. Army, explorers, and other travelers stopped at the fort to replenish supplies, such as water and food, and perform needed maintenance to their wagons.  The American frontiersman Kit Carson was employed as a hunter by the Bent brothers in 1841, and regularly visited the Fort. Likewise, the explorer John C. Frémont used the Fort as both a staging area and a replenishment junction, for his expeditions. During the Mexican–American War in 1846, the fort became a staging area for Colonel Stephen Watts Kearny's "Army of the West".

Ralph Emerson Twitchell makes the following statement.

Bent's Fort is described as having been a structure built of adobe bricks. It was 180 feet long and 135 feet wide. The walls were 15 feet in height and four feet thick and it was the strongest post at that time west of Ft. Leavenworth. The construction of this fort was commenced in 1828 ... at a point on the Arkansas somewhere between the present cities of Pueblo and Canon City, having been disadvantageously located. Four years were required in which to complete the structure. On the northwest and southeast corners were hexagonal bastions, in which were mounted a number of cannon. The walls of the fort served as walls of the rooms, all of which faced inwardly on a court or plaza. The walls were loopholed for musketry, and the entrance was through large wooden gates of very heavy timbers.

Destruction
In 1849 when a great cholera epidemic struck the Cheyenne and other Plains Indians, William Bent abandoned Bent's Fort and moved his headquarters north to Fort Saint Vrain on the South Platte. When he returned south in 1852, he relocated his trading business to his log trading post at Big Timbers, near what is now Lamar, Colorado. Later, in the fall of 1853, Bent began building a stone fort on the bluff above Big Timbers, Bent's New Fort, where he conducted his trading business until 1860.

When the fort was reconstructed in 1976, its authenticity was based on the use of  archaeological excavations, paintings and original sketches, diaries and other existing historical data from the period.

In popular culture
 The Fort was used as Fort Laramie in the 1979 CBS mini-series The Chisholms, starring Robert Preston.
 In George MacDonald Fraser's 1982 novel, Flashman and the Redskins, the anti-hero Flashman is present at the destruction of Bents' Fort.
 Bent's Fort is featured briefly in Larry McMurty's 1985 Pulitzer Prize-winning novel Lonesome Dove, as well as in the 1989 Emmy Award-winning  four-part TV miniseries adapted from the book.
 Bent's Fort in the spring of 1834 is a major setting for Terry Johnston's 1988 novel One-Eyed Dream.
 Bent's Fort is featured briefly in episode 3 of James Michener's Centennial miniseries in 1978.
 Bent's Fort inspired video game developer  Rockstar Games to recreate its likeness in the 2010 game Red Dead Redemption as Fort Mercer in the Rio Bravo region.
 A restaurant named "The Fort" in Morrison, Colorado, near Denver has architecture and decor adapted from Bent's Old Fort, with motif and cuisine inspired from the region in the 1830s.

Gallery

See also
 List of National Historic Landmarks in Colorado
 First Battle of Adobe Walls
 Owl Woman

Notes

References
David Fridtjof Halaas and Andrew E. Masich, Halfbreed: The Remarkable True Story Of George Bent - Caught Between The Worlds Of The Indian And The White Man, Da Capo Press (March 15, 2005), hardcover, 458 pages,

Further reading
 ; for juvenile audience
 
 ; reprinted in 1972 by University of Nebraska Press,

External links

 Bent's Old Fort National Historic Site National Park Service
 Bent's Old Fort: Amphibians and ReptilesUnited States Geological Survey
 Photos of Bents Fort provided by Rocky mountain Profiles
 Architectural drawings and documentation at Historic American Buildings Survey

Bent's Old Fort National Historic Site
Archaeological sites in Colorado
Forts in Colorado
Living museums in Colorado
Museums in Otero County, Colorado
National Historic Landmarks in Colorado
National Historic Sites in Colorado
Protected areas established in 1960
Protected areas of Otero County, Colorado
Santa Fe Trail
Buildings and structures on the National Register of Historic Places in Colorado
1960 establishments in Colorado
National Register of Historic Places in Otero County, Colorado